The Scotlands is a residential area of Wolverhampton, West Midlands (formerly Staffordshire), England.

It predominantly consists of council houses built between 1935 and 1937 to rehouse families from town centre slums, and stands about two miles to the north-east of central Wolverhampton, near the main A460 road towards Cannock, effective as an extension to the large Low Hill housing estate which was developed a decade earlier.

References 

Areas of Wolverhampton